Recuerdo de Machu Picchu 3 (Las terrazas), is an outdoor 1984 oxidized iron sculpture by Colombian artist Eduardo Ramírez Villamizar, installed at the Museum of Fine Arts, Houston's Lillie and Hugh Roy Cullen Sculpture Garden, in the U.S. state of Texas. The sculpture was purchased by the museum with funds provided by the Caribbean Art Fund and the Caroline Wiess Law Accessions Endowment Fund. It measures 55 1/8 x 114 3/16 x 41 5/16 inches.

See also

 1984 in art
 List of public art in Houston

References

1984 establishments in Texas
1984 sculptures
Iron sculptures in the United States
Lillie and Hugh Roy Cullen Sculpture Garden
Works by Colombian people